Bao'an Highway is a station on Shanghai Metro Line 1.

References

Line 1, Shanghai Metro
Shanghai Metro stations in Baoshan District
Railway stations in China opened in 2007
Railway stations in Shanghai